Sardasht County is in West Azerbaijan province, Iran. The capital of the county is the city of Sardasht. At the 2006 census, the county's population was 104,146 in 20,414 households. The following census in 2011 counted 111,590 people in 26,546 households. At the 2016 census, the county's population was 118,849 in 31,049 households.

Administrative divisions

The population history of Sardasht County's administrative divisions over three consecutive censuses is shown in the following table. The latest census shows two districts, six rural districts, and three cities.

Tourism
The Shalmash Falls are located in Sardasht County.  It is located in a green forested valley.

References

 

Counties of West Azerbaijan Province